Richard Formby is a British musician, engineer and producer. As well as releasing his own solo music, he has been a member of various bands. Formby produced the albums Two Dancers (2009) and Smother (2011) by Wild Beasts, as well as Some Say I So I Say Light (2013) by Ghostpoet and News from Nowhere (2013) by Darkstar.

Biography
Formby has released his own solo electronic experimental music as well as being a member of The Jazz Butcher and In Embrace. He was part of Peter Kember's post-Spaceman 3 project Spectrum, for the album Soul Kiss (Glide Divine) (1992).

He owns a studio in Leeds.

Discography

Solo albums by Formby
Outside the Angular Colony (Glass, 1981)
The Machine Room (Bruton, 1999)
I Was a Sleep But Now I Am a Wake (Golden Lab, 2005)
Volume One (Mind Expansion, 2007)
Sine (Preserved Sound, 2013)

Albums produced by Formby
Taste (1989) by The Telescopes
When in Rome, Kill Me (1989) by Cud
Word of Mouth (2004) by The Blueskins
Not on Top (2005) by Herman Dune
Two Dancers (2009) by Wild Beasts – nominated for the Mercury Prize
Smother (2011) by Wild Beasts
The Shallows (2012) by I Like Trains
Some Say I So I Say Light (2013) by Ghostpoet
News from Nowhere (2013) by Darkstar
Moondust for My Diamond (2021) by Hayden Thorpe

References

External links

Formby's profile at Moto Music Management

English record producers
English experimental musicians
English electronic musicians
20th-century English musicians
21st-century English musicians
Living people
1960s births
Year of birth missing (living people)